Fawzi Abdussalam is a Libyan former cyclist. He competed in the sprint event at the 1980 Summer Olympics.

References

External links
 

Year of birth missing (living people)
Living people
Libyan male cyclists
Olympic cyclists of Libya
Cyclists at the 1980 Summer Olympics
Place of birth missing (living people)